Paweł Mróz (born June 14, 1984) is a Polish bobsledder who has competed since 2008. He finished 14th in the four-man event at the 2010 Winter Olympics in Vancouver.

External links

1984 births
Bobsledders at the 2010 Winter Olympics
Bobsledders at the 2014 Winter Olympics
Living people
Polish male bobsledders
Olympic bobsledders of Poland
People from Jelenia Góra
Sportspeople from Lower Silesian Voivodeship